American singer Michael Jackson (1958–2009) debuted on the professional music scene at age five as a member of the American family music group The Jackson 5 and began a solo career in 1971 while still part of the group. Jackson promoted seven of his solo albums with music videos or, as he would refer to them, "short films". Some of them drew criticism for their violent and sexual elements; others were lauded by critics and awarded Guinness World Records for their length, success, and cost.

In the early 1980s, Jackson became a dominant figure in popular culture and the first African-American entertainer to have a strong crossover fanbase on MTV. The popularity of his music videos that aired on MTV such as "Billie Jean", "Beat It" and "Thriller"—credited for transforming the music video from a promotional tool into an art form—helped bring fame to the relatively new channel. The success of these music videos helped shift MTV's focus from its original "rock 'n' roll only" format to pop and R&B and saved the channel from financial ruin.
Michael Jackson's "Thriller" short film marked a growth in scale for music videos and has been named the most successful music video ever by the Guinness World Records.
The 18-minute music video for "Bad", directed by Martin Scorsese, depicts Jackson and Wesley Snipes as members of an inner-city gang. Jackson paid cinematic tribute to West Side Story with the choreography. For the "Smooth Criminal" video, Jackson experimented with an anti-gravity lean, in which the performer leans forward at a 45-degree angle, beyond their center of gravity. Although the music video for "Leave Me Alone" was not officially released in the United States, it won a Golden Lion Award in 1989 for the quality of the special effects used in its production and a Grammy Award for Best Music Video, Short Form in 1990. Jackson received the MTV Video Vanguard Award in 1988, which was renamed the Michael Jackson Video Vanguard Award in his honor in 1991. He won the MTV Video Vanguard Artist of the Decade Award in 1990.

"Black or White" was released on November 14, 1991. It featured Macaulay Culkin, Tess Harper, George Wendt and Jackson. The video helped introduce morphing, seamlessly changing one image into another, as an important technology in music videos. "Remember the Time" was an elaborate production, with a complex dance routine, set in ancient Egypt featuring appearances by Eddie Murphy, Iman and Magic Johnson. The video for "In the Closet" featured supermodel Naomi Campbell in a courtship dance with Jackson.
The music video for "Scream", directed by Mark Romanek and production designer Tom Foden, is one of Jackson's most critically acclaimed. In 1995, it garnered eleven MTV Video Music Award nominations—more than any other music video. A year later, it won a Grammy for Best Music Video, Short Form; shortly afterward, at $7 million, Guinness World Records listed it as the most expensive music video ever made. "Earth Song" was accompanied by an expensive environmentally-themed music video showing images of animal cruelty, deforestation, pollution, and war. Using special effects, time is reversed so that life returns, wars end, and the forests re-grow. Released at the 1996 Cannes Film Festival, Michael Jackson's Ghosts was a short film written by Jackson and Stephen King and directed by Stan Winston. The video for Ghosts is over 38 minutes long and broke the Guinness World Record as the world's longest music video. The music video for "You Rock My World", which is thirteen and a half minutes long, was directed by Paul Hunter and released in 2001. The video features appearances by Chris Tucker and Marlon Brando. The video won an NAACP Image Award for Outstanding Music Video at the award show's 2002 ceremonies.

In 1978, Jackson appeared in his first film, The Wiz. It was nominated for four awards at the 51st Academy Awards. Jackson later starred in Disney's Captain EO in 1986, the anthology film Moonwalker in 1988 and the posthumous documentary This Is It in 2009.

List of music videos

1970s

1980s

1990s

2000s

2010s

2020s

Video albums

Film

Television
"Stark Raving Dad" (1991) was the first episode in the third season of The Simpsons. Jackson performed the speaking voice of Leon Kompowsky using the pseudonym John Jay Smith. The producers of the show were legally prevented from confirming that Jackson guest-starred, although many media sources assumed it was him. The episode was written specifically for Jackson, a fan of the show, who had called Matt Groening, the show's creator one night and offered to do a guest spot. The offer was accepted and Al Jean and Mike Reiss wrote a script based on an idea pitched by James L. Brooks. Groening and co-executive producer Sam Simon also contributed significantly to the writing of the episode.

In 2017, archival recordings of Jackson were used in the TV special Michael Jackson's Halloween.

References

Footnotes

Sources

 
 
 
 
 George, Nelson (2004). Michael Jackson: The Ultimate Collection booklet. Sony BMG.

External links 
 
 
 Michael Jackson at AllMovie

Jackson, Michael
Jackson, Michael
Videography